Wing Commander Douglas Arthur Davies  (12 January 1896 – 1992) was an officer of the British Royal Air Force, who was credited with 10 aerial victories in World War I, and also served during World War II.

Early life
Davies was born in Harrow, England, the first-born son of Mr. and Mrs. Arthur Davies.

World War I
On 17 October 1915, he was commissioned second lieutenant in the Wiltshire Regiment. On 20 November 1917, he was seconded to the Royal Flying Corps as a lieutenant and a flying officer.

By mid-1918, Davies was posted to 150 Squadron in Salonika as a Sopwith Camel pilot. He scored his first aerial victories on 12 June 1918, when he set one Albatros D.V afire and destroyed another. His second successful day saw him become an ace, as he destroyed two more Albatros D.Vs in one dogfight on 17 July, then drove another down out of control an hour and a half later. Six days later, he teamed with John Preston to destroy another. On 8 August, he drove down two enemy fighters out of control. Ten days later, he rounded off his victory string by driving down another pair of Albatros D.Vs out of control.

He earned the Distinguished Flying Cross for his prowess. It was announced in The London Gazette on 2 November 1918:

List of aerial victories

All victories gained while posted to No. 150 Squadron based at Salonika, Greece.

Between the wars
On 10 October 1919, Davies was awarded the French Croix de guerre avec Palme. On 17 December 1919, he transferred to the Royal Air Force's unemployed list. On 30 September 1921, he surrendered his commission in his regiment.

In May 1923, his engagement to Muriel Wilson was announced in Flight magazine.

On 26 January 1937, he was commissioned as a pilot officer (Class BB) in the RAF Reserve.

World War II
On 12 October 1940, Davies was confirmed in rank as a pilot officer. He later was granted the war substantive rank of flight lieutenant, dating from 28 September 1940. On 1 January 1944, he was promoted to squadron leader in the Administration & Special Duties Branch of RAF.

Post World War II
On 1 November 1947, Davies relinquished his commission as a flight lieutenant in the Royal Air Force Volunteer Reserve. On 1 January 1948, he surrendered his war substantive rank of squadron leader in the RAF Volunteer Reserve while retaining the rank of flight lieutenant. On 10 February 1954, Flight Lieutenant Davies relinquished his commission in RAF Volunteer Reserve, retaining the rank of wing commander. Davies was stationed to Kuwait as the RAF's attaché to Kuwait's air force from 1955 to 1958. He returned to Kuwait twice as a civilian, once in 1962 and once again in 1965. In 1966 during a "very tense meeting" that had "turned nasty" and "confrontational" between members of the Egyptian Air Force and members of the RAF in London, Davies told a group of Egyptian air force officers that if they went to war with Israel "they would lose and lose badly." In 1967 Davies was outspokenly supportive of Israel during the Six-Day War, and he advocated a closer relationship between Britain and Israel. During the Iran–Iraq War he warned against Britain arming Iraq, and he viewed the entire conflict as being potentially dangerous to Kuwait. After Saddam Hussein invaded Kuwait, Davies was strongly supportive of U.S. and British policy with regards to using force to remove Saddam Hussein's forces from Kuwait during the Gulf War.

References

British World War I flying aces
1896 births
1992 deaths
People from Harrow, London
Recipients of the Croix de Guerre 1914–1918 (France)
Wiltshire Regiment officers
Royal Flying Corps officers
Recipients of the Distinguished Flying Cross (United Kingdom)
British Army personnel of World War I
Royal Air Force Volunteer Reserve personnel of World War II
Royal Air Force wing commanders